The rhythmic individual hoop competition of the rhythmic gymnastics events at the 2011 Pan American Games was held on October 17 at the Nissan Gymnastics Stadium. The draw for the competition took place on August 1, 2011 in Guadalajara. The defending Pan American Games champion was Alexandra Orlando of Canada, who has since retired.

Schedule
All times are Central Standard Time (UTC-6).

Results

References

Gymnastics at the 2011 Pan American Games
2011 in women's gymnastics